is a railway station in the city of Anjō, Aichi, Japan, operated by Meitetsu.

Lines
Shin Anjō Station is served by the Meitetsu Nagoya Main Line and Meitetsu Nishio Line. It is a terminus for the 24.7 kilometer Nishio Line, and lies 38.5 kilometers from the terminus of the Nagoya Main Line at Toyohashi Station.

Station layout
The station has three island platforms serving six tracks connected by a footbridge. Track one terminates at this station. The station is staffed.

Platforms

Adjacent stations

Station history
The station was renamed Shin Anjo on 1 May 1970.

Passenger statistics
In fiscal 2017, the station was used by an average of 22,864 passengers daily (boarding passengers only).

Surrounding area
Makita head office

See also
 List of Railway Stations in Japan

References

External links

 Official web page 

Railway stations in Japan opened in 1923
Railway stations in Aichi Prefecture
Stations of Nagoya Railroad
Anjō, Aichi